Stephen Timothy "Steve" Quinn (born February 11, 1946 in Pittsburg, Kansas, United States) is a former American football center who played one season for the American Football League's Houston Oilers.

1946 births
Living people
People from Pittsburg, Kansas
Players of American football from Kansas
American football centers
Notre Dame Fighting Irish football players
Houston Oilers players
American Football League players